This is a list of earthquakes in 1902. Only magnitude 6.0 or greater earthquakes appear on the list. Exceptions to this are earthquakes which have caused death, injury or damage. Events which occurred in remote areas will be excluded from the list as they wouldn't have generated significant media interest. All dates are listed according to UTC time. The countries and their flags are noted as they would have appeared in this year for example the Netherlands being present-day Indonesia. The number of large (Magnitude 7.0+) events remained similar to the last couple of years. There were a number of events which caused high casualties. The deadliest quake struck Emirate of Bukhara in December. China and Guatemala also experienced high death tolls during the year.

Overall

By death toll 

 Note: At least 10 casualties

By magnitude 

 Note: At least 7.0 magnitude

Notable events

January

February

March

April

May

June

July

August

September

October

November

December

References 

1902
1902 natural disasters

1902